The Cheyenne language (informal spelling Tsisinstsistots), is the Native American language spoken by the Cheyenne people, predominantly in present-day Montana and Oklahoma, in the United States. It is part of the Algonquian language family. Like all other Algonquian languages, it has complex agglutinative polysynthetic morphology. This language is considered endangered, at different levels, in both states.

Classification
Cheyenne is one of the Algonquian languages, which is a sub-category of the Algic languages. Specifically, it is a Plains Algonquian language. However, Plains Algonquian, which also includes Arapaho and Blackfoot, is an areal rather than genetic subgrouping.

Geographic distribution

Cheyenne is spoken on the Northern Cheyenne Indian Reservation in Montana and in Oklahoma. On the Northern Cheyenne Indian Reservation in March 2013 there were approximately 10,050 enrolled tribal members, of which about 4,939 resided on the reservation; slightly more than a quarter of the population five years or older spoke a language other than English.

Current status 
The Cheyenne language is considered "definitely endangered" in Montana and "critically endangered" in Oklahoma by the UNESCO. In Montana the number of speakers were about 1700 in 2012 according to the UNESCO. In 2021 there are approximately 300 elderly speakers. In 2021 in Oklahoma there are fewer than 20 elderly speakers. There is no current information on any other state in the United States regarding the Cheyenne language.

The 2017 film Hostiles features extensive dialogue in Northern Cheyenne. The film's producers hired experts in the language and culture to ensure authenticity.

Revitalization efforts and education 
In 1997, the Cultural Affairs Department of Chief Dull Knife College applied to the Administration for Native Americans for an approximately $50,000 language preservation planning grant. The department wanted to use this money to assess the degree to which Cheyenne was being spoken on the Northern Cheyenne Reservation. Following this, the department wanted to use the compiled data to establish long-term community language goals, and to prepare Chief Dull Knife College to implement a Cheyenne Language Center and curriculum guide. In 2015, the Chief Dull Knife College sponsored the 18th Annual Language Immersion Camp. This event was organized into two weeklong sessions, and its aim was to educate the younger generation on their ancestral language. The first session focused on educating 5–10-year-olds, while the second session focused on 11- to 18-year-olds. Certified Cheyenne language instructors taught daily classes. Ultimately, the camp provided approximately ten temporary jobs for fluent speakers on the impoverished reservation. The state of Montana has passed a law that guarantees support for tribal language preservation for Montana tribes. Classes in the Cheyenne language are available at Chief Dull Knife College in Lame Deer, Montana, at Southwestern Oklahoma State University, and at Watonga High School in Watonga, Oklahoma.
There are also holistic approaches to language revitalization taken upon by the Cheyenne people to try and keep their language vital. This is done by recognizing the integrated nature of the Cheyenne language with games, crafts, and ceremony which are integrated in youth and community programs. The language is very often not being taught in the home so instead of just teaching grammar as a revitalization effort, holistic approaches attract more attention from new speakers and educate the new generation and counter language and culture loss.

Phonology

Vowels
Cheyenne has three basic vowel qualities .

Tones are often not represented in the orthography. Vowels can also be voiceless (e.g. ė ). The high and low tones are phonemic, while voiceless vowels' occurrence is determined by the phonetic context, making them allophones of the voiced vowels.

Consonants

Orthography
The Cheyenne orthography of 14 letters is neither a pure phonemic system nor a phonetic transcription; it is, in the words of linguist Wayne Leman, a "pronunciation orthography". In other words, it is a practical spelling system designed to facilitate proper pronunciation. Some allophonic variants, such as voiceless vowels, are shown.  represents the phoneme symbolized , and  represents .

Vowels

 a – 
 e – 
 o –

Consonants

 h – 
 k – 
 ' – 
 m – 
 n – 
 p – 
 s – 
 š – 
 t – 
 v – 
 x –

Tones
 á, é, ó – high tone
 ȧ, ė, ȯ or â, ê, ô – voiceless or whispered

Low tone is usually unmarked.

Feature system for phonemes 
The systematic phonemes of Cheyenne are distinguished by seven two-valued features. Scholar Donald G. Frantz defined these features as follows:
 Oral: primary articulation is oral (vs. at the glottis)
 Vocoid (voc): central resonant (oral) continuant
 Syllabic (syl): nuclear to syllable (vs. marginal)
 Closure (clos): stoppage of air flow at point of primary articulation ['non-continuant']
 Nasal (nas): velic is open
 Grave (grv): primary articulation at oral extremity (lips or velum) ['non-coronal' for consonants, 'back' for vowels]
 Diffuse (dif): primary articulation is relatively front ['anterior']

0 indicates the value is indeterminable/irrelevant. A blank indicates the value is specifiable, but context is required (even though any value could be inserted because the post-cyclical rules would change the value to the correct one). Parentheses enclose values that are redundant according to the phonological rules; these values simply represent the results of these rules.

Voicing 

Cheyenne has 14 orthographic letters representing 13 phonemes.  is written as  orthographically but is not a phoneme. This count excludes the results of allophonic devoicing, which are spelled with a dot over vowels. Devoicing naturally occurs in the last vowel of a word or phrase but can also occur in vowels at the penultimate and prepenultimate positions within a word. Phonemic  is absorbed by a preceding voiceless vowel. Examples are given below.

Penultimate devoicing 
   'ax'; 
   'the one who is big';
   'knife'

The rule is linked to the rule of e-epenthesis, which states simply that [e] appears in the environment of a consonant and a word boundary.

Prepenultimate devoicing 
   'flute';
    'sheep (pl.)';
   'if you ask him'

Special  and  devoicing 
   'they are gathering'; 
   'I regularly dance'; 
   'I punched him in the mouth'

Consonant devoicing 
  'He is drinking.'

Before a voiceless segment, a consonant is devoiced.

h-absorption 
  'kind' +  'imperative suffix' > 
  'conjunct prefix' +  'old' +  '3rd pers. suffix' >  'the one who is old'
  + 'you' +  'burn' +  'suffix for some 'you-me' transitive animate forms' >  ' you burn me'

The  is absorbed if it is preceded or followed by voiceless vowels.

Pitch and tone 
There are several rules that govern pitch use in Cheyenne.  Pitch can be ˊ = high, unmarked = low, ˉ = mid, and ˆ = raised high. According to linguist Wayne Leman, some research shows that Cheyenne may have a stress system independent from that of pitch. If this is the case, the stress system's role is very minor in Cheyenne prosody. It would have no grammatical or lexical function, unlike pitch.

High-raising
A high pitch becomes a raised high when it is not preceded by another high vowel and precedes an underlying word-final high.
   'duck'; 
   'boat'

Low-to-high raising
A low vowel is raised to the high position when it follows a high and is followed by a word final high.
   'ticks'; 
   'I see him'; 
   'cat'

Low-to-mid raising
A low vowel becomes a mid when it is followed by a word-final high but not directly preceded by a high vowel.
   'sheep (sg.)'; 
   'woman'; 
   'he is cooking'

High pushover
A high vowel becomes low if it comes after a high and followed by a phonetic low.
   'we (incl) prayed'; 
   'we (incl) love him'; 
   'we (excl) love'

Word-medial high raising
According to Leman, "some verbal prefixes and preverbs go through the process of Word-Medial High-Raising. A high is raised if it follows a high (which is not a trigger for the High Push-Over rule) and precedes a phonetic low. One or more voiceless syllables may come between the two highs.  (A devoiced vowel in this process must be underlyingly low, not an underlyingly high vowel which has been devoiced by the High-Pitch Devoicing rule.)"
   'he is eating'; 
   'when I sang'; 
   'I didn't give him to him'

Tone 
The following pairs of phrases demonstrate pitch contrasts in the Cheyenne language: 
  ('if I am hungry')
  ('if you are hungry')
  ('dog')
  ('dogs')
As noted by Donald G. Frantz, phonological rules dictate some pitch patterns, as indicated by the frequent shift of accent when suffixes are added (e.g. compare  'raccoon' and  'raccoons'). In order for the rules to work, certain vowels are assigned inherent accent. For example, the word for 'badger' has a permanent accent position:  (sg.),  (pl.)

Nonnasal reflexes of Proto-Algonquian *k 
The research of linguist Paul Proulx provides an explanation for how these reflexes develop in Cheyenne: "First, *n and *h drop and all other consonants give glottal catch before *k. *k then drops except in element-final position. Next, there is an increment before any remaining *k not preceded by a glottal catch: a secondary h (replaced by š after e) ) in words originating in the Cheyenne Proper dialect, and a vowel in those originating in the Sutaio (So'taa'e) dialect. In the latter dialect the *k gives glottal catch in a word-final syllable (after the loss of some final syllables) and drops elsewhere, leaving the vowel increment. Sutaio 'k clusters are all reduced to glottal catch."

Grammar
Cheyenne is a morphologically polysynthetic language with a sophisticated, agglutinating verb system contrasting a relatively simple noun structure.  Many Cheyenne verbs can stand alone in sentences, and can be translated by complete English sentences.  Aside from its verb structure, Cheyenne has several grammatical features that are typical of Algonquian languages, including an animate/inanimate noun classification paradigm, an obviative third person and distinction of clusivity in the first person plural pronoun.

Order and mode
Like all Algonquian languages, Cheyenne shows a highly developed modal paradigm.  Algonquianists traditionally describe the inflections of verbs in these languages as being divided into three "orders," with each order further subdivided into a series of "modes," each of which communicates some aspect of modality.   The charts below provide examples of verb forms of every order in each mode, after Leman (2011) and Mithun (1999).

Independent order
This order governs both declarative and interrogative statements. The modes of this order are generally subdivided along lines of evidentiality.

Conjunct order
This order governs a variety of dependent clause types.  Leman (2011) characterizes this order of verbs as requiring other verbal elements in order to establish complete meaning.  Verbs in the conjunct order are marked with a mode-specific prefix and a suffix marking person, number and animacy.

Imperative order
The third order governs commands.  Cheyenne, in common with several other North American languages, distinguishes two types of imperative mood, one indicating immediate action, and the other indicating delayed action.

Verb morphology
The Cheyenne verb system is very complex and verb constructions are central to the morphosyntax of the language, to the point that even adjectives and even some nouns are largely substantive in nature.  Verbs change according to a number of factors, such as modality, person and transitivity, as well as the animacy of the referent, each of these categories being indicated by the addition of an affix to the basic verb stem. There are also several instrumental, locative and adverbial affixes that add further information to the larger verb construction.  This can result in very long, complex verbs that are able to stand alone as entire sentences in their own right.
All Cheyenne verbs have a rigid templatic structure. The affixes are placed according to the following paradigm:

person – (tense) – (directional) – (preverb) – ROOT – (medial) – final

Pronominal affixes
Cheyenne represents the participants of an expression not as separate pronoun words but as affixes on the verb. There are three basic pronominal prefixes in Cheyenne:
first person
second person
third person

These three basic prefixes can be combined with various suffixes to express all of Cheyenne's pronominal distinctions. For example, the prefix  can be combined on a verb with the suffix -me to express the first person plural exclusive.

Tense
Tense in Cheyenne is expressed by the addition of a specific tense morpheme between the pronominal prefix and the verb stem.  Verbs do not always contain tense information, and an unmarked present tense verb can be used to express both past and "recent" present tense in conversation.  Thus,  could mean both 'I see him' and 'I saw him' depending on the context.

Thus:

      'I see him'
    'I saw him'

Directional affixes
These prefixes address whether the action of the verb is moving "toward" or "away from" some entity, usually the speaker.

toward
toward (before -h)
toward (before a vowel)
toward (before -t)
away from

Preverbs
Following Algonquianist terminology, Leman (2011) describes "preverbs", morphemes which add adjectival or adverbial information to the verb stem.  Multiple preverbs can be combined within one verb complex. The following list represents only a small sample.

secretly
previously 
suddenly
extremely
slightly
regularly
good, well
much, a lot
for the purpose of
slowly, softly
mistakenly

Medial affixes
This large group of suffixes provide information about something associated with the root, usually communicating that the action is done with or to a body part. Thus:  ('he-wash-mouth') = 'he gargled'. Following is a sample of medial suffixes:

mouth
face
arm
body 
hand
foot

Medial suffixes can also be used with nouns to create compound words or to coin entirely new words from existing morphemes, as in:

 [short-face-dog] = 'bulldog'

Final affixes
Cheyenne verbs take different object agreement endings depending upon the animacy of the subject and the transitivity of the verb itself.  Intransitive verbs take endings depending upon the animacy of their subject, whereas transitive verbs take endings that depend upon the animacy of their object.  All verbs can therefore be broadly categorized into one of four classes: Animate Intransitive (AI), Inanimate Instransitive (II), Transitive Animate (TA) and Transitive Inanimate (TI).  Following are the most common object agreement markers for each verb class.

Animate Intransitive (AI)
Inanimate Intransitive (II)
Transitive Animate (TA)
Transitive Inanimate  (TI)

Negation
Verbs are negated by the addition of the infix  immediately after the pronominal affix.

Nouns
Nouns are classified according to animacy. They change according to grammatical number (singular and plural) but are not distinguished according to gender or definiteness.

Obviation
When two third persons are referred to by the same verb, the object of the sentence becomes obviated, what Algonquianists refer to as a "fourth person." It is essentially an "out of focus" third person. As with possessive obviation above, the presence of a fourth person triggers morphological changes in both the verb and noun. For example:

                 'I saw a man'
  'The woman saw a man'

Verbs register the presence of obviated participants whether or not they are present as nouns.  These forms could be likened to a kind of passive voice, although Esteban (2012) argues that since Cheyenne is a "reference-dominated language where case marking and word order are governed by the necessity to code pragmatic roles," a passive-like construction is assumed.  This phenomenon is an example of typical Algonquian "person hierarchy," in which animacy and first personhood take precedence over other forms.

Number
Both animate and inanimate nouns are pluralized by the addition of suffixes. These suffixes are irregular and can change slightly according to a complex system of phonological rules.

, Inanimate plural
Animate plural

Possession
Possession is denoted by a special set of pronominal suffixes.  Following is a list of the most common possession prefixes, although rarely some words take different prefixes. 
first person
second person
third person

Generally, possessive prefixes take a low pitch on the following vowel.

When a third person animate noun is possessed by another third person, the noun becomes obviated and takes a different form.  Much of the time, this obviated form is identical to the noun's regular plural form, with only a few exceptions. This introduces ambiguity in that it is not always possible to tell whether an obviated noun is singular or plural.

Historical development

Like all the Algonquian languages, Cheyenne developed from a reconstructed ancestor referred to as Proto-Algonquian (often abbreviated "PA"). The sound changes on the road from PA to modern Cheyenne are complex, as exhibited by the development of the PA word  'man' into Cheyenne :

First, the PA suffix  drops
PA * changes to 
 is added before word-initial vowels
PA *θk has the Sutaio reflex ' in  'she tells lies', but the Cheyenne-Proper reflex 'k in  'tree-bark'. According to linguist Paul Proulx, this gave off the appearance that "speakers of both Cheyenne dialects—perhaps mixed bands—were involved in the Arapaho contact that led to this unusual reflex of PA *k.".

Lexicon
Some Cheyenne words (with the Proto-Algonquian reconstructions where known):
ame 'grease' (from PA )
he'e 'his liver' (from PA )
hē'e 'woman' (from PA )
hetane 'man' (from PA )
matana 'milk' (from PA )

Translation history
Early work was done on the Cheyenne language by Rodolphe Charles Petter, a Mennonite missionary based in Lame Deer, Montana, from 1916. Petter published a mammoth dictionary of Cheyenne in 1915.

Current translations 
Currently there are many online resources that allow for the instant translation from any language to the Cheyenne language. There are online vocabulary lists, pronunciation guides, dictionaries, etc. Along with these resources, there are numbers of published books regarding the history of the language as well as explain its grammar These resources can be found online or in libraries that carry these published books.

Notes

References
 Esteban, Avelino Corral. "Does There Exist Passive Voice in Lakhota and Cheyenne?" Revista de Lingüística y Lenguas Aplicadas vol.7 (2012): 93.
 Fisher Louise, Leroy Pine Sr., Marie Sanchez, and Wayne Leman, 2004. Cheyenne Dictionary. Lame Deer, Montana: Chief Dull Knife College.
 Goddard, Ives. "The historical origins of Cheyenne inflections."  Papers of the Thirty-First Algonquian Conference, edited by John D. Nichols. Winnnipeg: University of Manitoba, 2000. pp.78-129. 
 Mithun, Marianne. "The Languages of Native North America." Cambridge University Press, 1999
 Murray, Sarah E.  "Two Imperatives in Cheyenne: Some Preliminary Distinctions." In Monica Macaulay, et al. Papers of the Forty-Fourth Algonquian Conference. State University of New York Press. pp. 242–56.
 Petter, Rodolphe. "English-Cheyenne Dictionary." Kettle Falls, WA: Rodolphe Petter, 1915
 Petter, Rodolphe. "Sketch of the Cheyenne Grammar." Lancaster, PA: American Anthropological Association, 1905
 Leman, Wayne. "A Reference Grammar of the Cheyenne Language." Lulu Press, 2011

External links 

Cheyenne online dictionary, maintained at Chief Dull Knife College
Modern Southern Cheyenne alphabet and pronunciation key
FREELANG Cheyenne-English and English-Cheyenne online dictionary
Cheyenne language flashcards at Quizlet, based on 
Cheyenne Language Website
Native Languages of the Americas: Cheyenne
Portions of the Anglican/Episcopal Prayer Book Cheyenne
Martin Luther's Small Catechism in Cheyenne
Lomax Collection Recording of Cheyenne (1956), Conversation
OLAC resources in and about the Cheyenne language

Language
Plains Algonquian languages
Indigenous languages of the North American Plains
Indigenous languages of Oklahoma
Indigenous languages of Montana
Agglutinative languages
Endangered languages of the United States
Tonal languages